The 1944 Illinois Fighting Illini football team was an American football team that represented the University of Illinois during the 1944 Big Ten Conference football season.  In their third year under head coach Ray Eliot, the Illini compiled a 5–3–1 record, were ranked #15 in the final AP Poll, and finished in sixth place in the Big Ten Conference.  The team lost three games to teams ranked in the top 10 in the AP Poll: #9-ranked Notre Dame (7–13); #8-ranked Michigan (0–14); and #2-ranked Ohio State (12–26). Halfback Buddy Young was selected as the team's most valuable player.

Schedule

References

Illinois
Illinois Fighting Illini football seasons
Illinois Fighting Illini football